This is a list of rivers in Senegal. This list is arranged  by drainage basin, with respective tributaries indented under each larger stream's name.

Atlantic Ocean

Sénégal River
Vallée du Ferlo
Tiângol Lougguéré
Vallée de Mboune
Doué River 
Falémé River
Saloum River
Sine River
Gambia River
Sandougou River
Koulountou River
Niéri Ko
Mayél Samou
Niokolo Koba
Geba River (Kayanga River)
Casamance River
Cool River

References

Rand McNally, The New International Atlas, 1993.
 GEOnet Names Server

Senegal
Rivers